Lucienne Bogaert (born Lucienne Jeanne Gabrielle Lefebvre; 6 January 1892 in Caudry, Nord – 4 February 1983 in Montrouge, Hauts-de-Seine) was a French actress. She started her career in theatre, but later also worked in film. After she divorced her husband Robert Bogaert, she retained his name for professional purposes.

Career
After her stage debut, Bogaert joined the company at the Théâtre du Vieux-Colombier and then worked with Louis Jouvet at the Théâtre des Champs-Élysées where she played the role of The Sphinx in Jean Cocteau's The Infernal Machine. On film she was often cast in the role of mothers such as in Robert Bresson's Les Dames du Bois de Boulogne and in Julien Duvivier's Voici le temps des assassins.

Stage
1917: Twelfth Night, directed by Jacques Copeau, Garrick Theatre, New York City
1918: The Miser, directed by Jacques Copeau, Garrick Theatre, New York City
1918: La Surprise de l'amour, directed by Jacques Copeau, Garrick Theatre, New York City
1918: L'Amour médecin, directed by Jacques Copeau, Garrick Theatre, New York City
1918: The Brothers Karamazov, directed by Jacques Copeau, Garrick Theatre, New York City
1918: The Marriage of Figaro, directed by Jacques Copeau, Garrick Theatre, New York City    
1926: Le Dictateur by Jules Romains, directed by Louis Jouvet, Théâtre des Champs-Élysées
1927: Léopold le bien-aimé by Jean Sarment, directed by Louis Jouvet, Théâtre des Champs-Élysées
1928: Siegfried, directed by Louis Jouvet, Théâtre des Champs-Élysées
1929: Suzanne by Steve Passeur, directed by Louis Jouvet, Théâtre des Champs-Élysées
1929: Amphitryon 38 by Jean Giraudoux, directed by Louis Jouvet, Théâtre des Champs-Élysées
1931: L'Eau fraîche by Pierre Drieu la Rochelle, directed by Louis Jouvet, Théâtre des Champs-Élysées
1931: Une taciturne by Roger Martin du Gard, directed by Louis Jouvet, Théâtre des Champs-Élysées
1932: La Margrave d'Alfred Savoir, directed by Louis Jouvet, Théâtre des Champs-Élysées
1934: Miss Ba by Rudolph Besier, directed by Lugné-Poe, théâtre des Ambassadeurs
1934: The Infernal Machine by Jean Cocteau, directed by Louis Jouvet, Comédie des Champs-Élysées  
1938: Juliette by Jean Bassan, directed by Paulette Pax, théâtre de l'Œuvre
1938: Le Jardin d'Ispahan by Jean-Jacques Bernard, directed by Paulette Pax, théâtre de l'Œuvre
1939: Pas d'amis, pas d'ennuis by S. H. Terac, directed by Paulette Pax, théâtre de l'Œuvre
1940: L'Insoumise by Pierre Frondaie, théâtre Édouard VII
1942: L'Enchanteresse by Maurice Rostand, directed by Paulette Pax, théâtre de l'Œuvre
1945: The Madwoman of Chaillot by Jean Giraudoux, directed by Louis Jouvet, théâtre de l'Athénée   
1947: The Apollo of Bellac by Jean Giraudoux, directed by Louis Jouvet, théâtre de l'Athénée
1950: La neige était sale by Frédéric Dard d'après Georges Simenon, directed by Raymond Rouleau, théâtre de l'Œuvre
1952: La Dame de trèfle by Gabriel Arout, directed by Michel Vitold, théâtre Saint-Georges
1955: Anastasia by Marcelle Maurette, directed by Jean Le Poulain, théâtre Antoine 
1955: Gaspar Diaz by Dominique Vincent, directed by Claude Régy, théâtre Hébertot
1956: Le Miroir by Armand Salacrou, directed by Henri Rollan, théâtre des Ambassadeurs 
1958: La Dame de trèfle by Gabriel Arout, directed by Michel Vitold, Théâtre du Gymnase Marie Bell
1961: Les Papiers d'Aspern by Michael Redgrave, directed by Raymond Rouleau, Théâtre des Mathurins
1962: Les femmes aussi ont perdu la guerre by Curzio Malaparte, directed by Raymond Gérôme, théâtre des Mathurins   
1963: Le Fil rouge by Henry Denker, directed by Raymond Rouleau, Théâtre du Gymnase Marie Bell

Filmography

External links
 

1892 births
1983 deaths
French stage actresses
French film actresses
French silent film actresses
People from Caudry
20th-century French actresses